Kutsal Damacana is a 2007 Turkish comedy film, directed by Kamil Aydın, starring Şafak Sezer as a man who disguises himself as a priest to help remove a spell.

Production
The film was shot on location in Istanbul, Turkey.

Synopsis
Former sailor Fikret is having trouble settling into his new life in Istanbul and has begun to make use the local church’s facilities. When the priest Artin goes on a trip to Vatican, Fikret starts selling off the church's cellar of expensive wines and stays in priest's room at night. Fikret spends most of his remaining time gambling on horse races and lecturing Asim, a naïve young boy working at the car wash located next door to the church who perceives him as a surrogate as a father figure. Fikret and Asim learn of a rich widowed businesswoman, Deniz, who thinks that her sister, Selen, has had a spell put upon her and is prepared to pay anything to have it lifted. Fikret decides to go to Deniz's house disguised as a priest but gets more than he bargained for.

Release

Reception
The film was one of the highest grossing Turkish films of 2007 with a total gross of US$3,721,075.

References

External links
 

2007 films
2007 comedy horror films
Films set in Turkey
Turkish comedy horror films
2000s Turkish-language films